Myagde Rural Municipality (Myagde Gaupalika) (Nepali: म्याग्दे गाउँपालिका) is a Gaunpalika in Tanahaun District in Gandaki Province of Nepal. On 12 March 2017, the government of Nepal implemented a new local administrative structure, in which VDCs have been replaced with municipal and Village Councils. Myagde is one of these 753 local units.

Demographics
At the time of the 2011 Nepal census, Myagde Rural Municipality had a population of 22,502. Of these, 67.0% spoke Nepali, 22.3% Magar, 7.2% Newar, 2.7% Gurung, 0.1% Bhojpuri, 0.1% Kumhali, 0.1% Tamang, 0.1% Tharu, 0.1% Urdu and 0.2% other languages as their first language.

In terms of ethnicity/caste, 31.9% were Magar, 11.9% Kami, 11.6% Newar, 10.8% Chhetri, 9.1% Hill Brahmin, 6.4% Sarki, 4.5% Damai/Dholi, 3.8% Gurung, 3.7% Thakuri, 2.3% Kumal, 0.9% Gharti/Bhujel, 0.8% Badi, 0.5% Sanyasi/Dasnami, 0.3% Khawas, 0.3% Tamang, 0.1% Gaine, 0.1% Majhi, 0.1% Musalman, 0.1% Rai, 0.1% other Terai, 0.1% Tharu and 0.4% others.

In terms of religion, 95.6% were Hindu, 3.1% Buddhist, 0.9% Christian, 0.1% Muslim and 0.3% others.

In terms of literacy, 75.6% could read and write, 1.9% could only read and 22.3% could neither read nor write.

References 

Tanahun District
Gandaki Province
Rural municipalities of Nepal established in 2017
Rural municipalities in Tanahun District